The East Indies Station was a formation and command of the British Royal Navy. Created in 1744 by the Admiralty, it was under the command of the Commander-in-Chief, East Indies.

Even in official documents, the term East Indies Station was often used. In 1941 the ships of the China Squadron and East Indies Squadron were merged to form the Eastern Fleet under the control of the Commander-in-Chief, Eastern Fleet. The China Station then ceased as a separate command. The East Indies Station was disbanded in 1958.

It encompassed Royal Navy Dockyards and bases in East Africa, Middle East, India and Ceylon, and other ships not attached to other fleets. For many years under rear admirals, from the 1930s the Commander-in-Chief was often an Admiral or a Vice-Admiral.

History

The East Indies Station was established as a Royal Navy command in 1744. From 1831 to 1865, the East Indies and the China Station were a single command known as the East Indies and China Station. The East Indies Station, established in 1865, was responsible for British naval operations in the Indian Ocean (excluding the waters around the Dutch East Indies, South Africa and Australia) and included the Persian Gulf and the Red Sea. From 1913 the station was renamed the Egypt and East Indies Station until 1918.

Anti-slavery activities in East Africa
During the 1850s and 1860s the Royal Navy fought to suppress the slave trade operating out of Zanzibar up to the North Coast of the Arabian Sea. An East African Squadron, which was part of the East Indies Station, was active in suppressing slavery in 1869. The mission of Sir Bartle Frere in 1869 "produced... a recommendation that a guardship be permanently stationed off the Zanzibar coast." Britain's real intentions in East Africa was to stop other European naval powers from establishing any similar bases in the region, and the station's purpose was to protect British trade interests passing through the Western Indian Ocean. Rawley writes that Captain George Sulivan and his successor directed the activities of the old ship-of-the-line , reequipped as both prison and hospital, with some success. London served as a base for cruisers operating against the slaving dhows, for four years.

By 1873, London was a hulk, serving as a depot ship in Zanzibar Bay, off the east coast of Africa. In March 1878 she was recommissioned, and involved in the suppression of the slave trade in the area, serving as a central depot for many smaller steam screw boats; she functioned as a repair depot, a hospital and a storage ship. At this time there were Africans from West Africa (Kroomen or Krumen) and East Africa (Seedies or Sidis) serving on board. There were also Zanzibari and Arab interpreters and cooks from Portuguese Goa (India). London was sold and broken up in 1884.

The East Indies Station had bases at Colombo, Trincomalee, Bombay, Basra and Aden.

Second World War 
In early May 1941, the Commander-in-Chief directed forces to support the pursuit of Pinguin, the German raider that eventually sank after the action of 8 May 1941 against .

Also assigned to the station was 814 Naval Air Squadron at China Bay, Ceylon, which unit was at that time equipped with Fairey Swordfish torpedo bombers.

In response to increased Japanese threats, the separate East Indies Station was merged with the China Station in December 1941, to form the Eastern Fleet. Later the Eastern Fleet became the East Indies Fleet. In 1952, after the Second World War ended, the East Indies Fleet became the Far East Fleet.

Meanwhile, a separate Commander-in-Chief for the East Indies was reappointed. During the 1950s, the task for Royal Navy vessels in the East Indies "..was to deliver fighting power in support of British foreign policy, be that in major warfighting (Korea) or low intensity operations such as counterinsurgency (Malaya), and to offer a British military presence in support of national policy." But disagreement over Suez meant that the Ceylonese Government did not wish to let British naval forces use their bases in an emergency, and this policy was reaffirmed by the new government installed after the 1956 Ceylonese parliamentary election. The Navy Yard, and Admiralty House were handed over on 15 October 1957, the flag was lowered over the shore establishment HMS Highflyer, and the next day, 16 October 1957, the last flagship, HMS Ceylon, left Trincomalee. The station was temporarily relocated to Bahrain. The Senior Naval Officer, Persian Gulf was to become an independent commander with the title Commodore, Arabian Seas and Persian Gulf. "At nine o'clock on the morning of 7 September 1958, 'the flag of the one-hundredth Commander in Chief of the East Indies Station, Vice Admiral Sir Hilary Biggs, was hauled down over HMS Jufair,'" the Royal Navy base in Bahrain.

Subordinate Commands

Flag Officer, East Africa 
Originally established by the Royal Navy as East Coast of Africa Station (1862–1919) was administered by the Flag Officer, East Africa. This officer was subordinate to the Commander-in-Chief, East Indies Station, then later came under the Eastern Fleet from 1862, from April 1942 to September 1943, and then the command's name changed back to the East Indies station.

Royal Indian Navy
The Royal Indian Navy (RIN) was the naval force of British India and the Dominion of India from 1 May 1830 to 26 January 1950. It came under the East Indies Station at the outbreak of the Second World War on 3 September 1939. In December 1941 it came under the command of the new Eastern Fleet.

Vice-Admiral Sir Herbert Fitzherbert was the Flag Officer Commanding, Royal Indian Navy, from September 1939 to December 1941.

Red Sea 
The Senior Naval Officer, Red Sea, was responsible to the Commander-in-Chief, East Indies, and during the Second World War for a period flew his flag afloat in HMS Egret.

At the beginning of the war Rear Admiral A.J.L. Murray was Senior Officer, Red Sea Force.

On 21 October 1941 the title was changed to Flag Officer, Red Sea, and that officer was resubordinated to the Commander-in-Chief Mediterranean Fleet, until 17 May 1942. On 18 May 1942 the title was changed again to Flag Officer, Commanding Red Sea and Canal Area, and  transferred again to the Eastern Fleet.

Persian Gulf 
The Royal Navy's presence in the Persian Gulf was originally located at Basidu, Qishm Island, in Persia (c. 1850–1935), then later Juffair, Bahrain. It was commanded by the Senior Naval Officer, Persian Gulf. It included a naval base, depot and naval forces known as the Persian Gulf Patrol, then the Persian Gulf Squadron later called the Persian Gulf Division. It was a sub-command of the East Indies Station until 1958 when it was merged with the Red Sea Station under the new appointment of Commodore, Arabian Seas and Persian Gulf.

Naval officers, ports and bases

Subordinate naval formations

Shore establishments

Commanders
 = died in post

Commander-in-Chief, East Indies
Prior to 1862 flag officers were appointed to coloured squadrons. Command flags are shown below. See: Royal Navy ranks, rates, and uniforms of the 18th and 19th centuries.

Post holders included:

C-in-C, East Indies and China Station

Note: for the period 1832–1865.

C-in-C, East Indies & Cape of Good Hope Station
Post holders included:

C-in-C, East Indies Station

C-in-C, East Indies and Egypt Station
Note:The post was sometimes styled as Senior Naval Officer, Egypt, and Commander-in-Chief, East Indies Station.

C-in-C, East Indies Station

Chief of Staff 1939-41
Included:

Note: Under East Indies Station briefly when the Eastern Fleet its established Rear-Admiral Palliser becomes COS to C-in-C, Eastern Fleet.

See also
 List of fleets and major commands of the Royal Navy
 List of Eastern Fleet ships

Notes

References

Further reading 
 Peter A. Ward, British Naval Power in the East, 1794-1805: The Command of Admiral Peter Rainier, Boydell Press

External links
 The British Pacific and East Indies Fleets
 Commander-in-Chief East Indies, recommendations for awards, 1858 
 National Archives, Folios 191-261: telegrams from Admiralty to Commander-in-Chief East Indies, 1914

Commands of the Royal Navy
Military units and formations established in 1865
Military units and formations disestablished in 1941
Military units and formations of the Royal Navy in World War II